The Valea Roșie is a left tributary of the river Olt in Romania. It discharges into the Olt near Bixad.

References

Rivers of Romania
Rivers of Covasna County